The Oliver Hazard Perry class is a class of guided-missile frigates named after U.S. Commodore Oliver Hazard Perry, the hero of the naval Battle of Lake Erie. Also known as the Perry or FFG-7 (commonly "fig seven") class, the warships were designed in the United States in the mid-1970s as general-purpose escort vessels inexpensive enough to be bought in large numbers to replace World War II-era destroyers and complement 1960s-era s.

In Admiral Elmo Zumwalt's "high low fleet plan", the FFG-7s were the low-capability ships, with the s serving as the high-capability ships. Intended to protect amphibious landing forces, supply and replenishment groups, and merchant convoys from aircraft and submarines. They were also later part of battleship-centered surface action groups and aircraft carrier battle groups/strike groups. 55 ships were built in the United States: 51 for the United States Navy and four for the Royal Australian Navy (RAN). Eight were built in Taiwan, six in Spain, and two in Australia for their navies. Former U.S. Navy warships of this class have been sold or donated to the navies of Bahrain, Egypt, Poland, Pakistan, Taiwan, and Turkey.

The first of the 51 U.S. Navy-built Oliver Hazard Perry frigates entered into service in 1977, and the last remaining in active service, was decommissioned on 29 September 2015. The retired vessels were mostly mothballed with some transferred to other navies for continued service and some used as weapons targets and sunk. Some of the U.S. Navy's frigates, such as USS Duncan (14.6 years in service), had fairly short careers, while a few lasted as long as 30+ years in active U.S. service, with some lasting even longer after being sold or donated to other navies. In 2020, the Navy announced the new  as their latest class of frigates.

Design and construction

The ships were designed by the Bath Iron Works shipyard in Maine in partnership with the New York-based naval architects Gibbs & Cox. The design process was notable as the initial design was accomplished with the help of computers in 18 hours by Raye Montague, a civilian U.S. Navy naval engineer, making it the first ship designed by computer.

The long-hull ships (FFG 8, 28, 29, 32, 33, and 36–61) carry the larger SH-60 Seahawk LAMPS III helicopters, while the short-hulled warships carry the smaller and less-capable SH-2 Seasprite LAMPS I. Aside from the lengths of their hulls, the principal difference between the versions is the location of the aft capstan: on long-hull ships, it sits a step below the level of the flight deck to provide clearance for the tail rotor of the longer Seahawk helicopters.

The long-hull ships carry the RAST (Recovery Assist Securing and Traversing) system (also known as a Beartrap (hauldown device)) for the Seahawk. It is a hook, cable, and winch system that can reel in a Seahawk from a hovering flight, expanding the ship's pitch-and-roll range in which flight operations are permitted. The FFG 8, 29, 32, and 33 were built as "short-hull" warships but were later modified into "long-hull" warships.

Oliver Hazard Perry-class frigates were the second class of surface ships (after the s) in the U.S. Navy to be built with gas turbine propulsion. The gas turbine propulsion plant was more automated than other Navy propulsion plants at the time, and it could be centrally monitored and controlled from a remote engineering control center away from the engines. The gas turbine propulsion plants also allowed the ship's speed to be controlled directly from the bridge via a throttle control, a first for the U.S. Navy.

American shipyards constructed Oliver Hazard Perry-class ships for the U.S. Navy and the Royal Australian Navy (RAN). Early American-built Australian ships were originally built as the "short-hull" version, but they were modified during the 1980s to the "long-hull" design. Shipyards in Australia, Spain, and Taiwan have produced several warships of the "long-hull" design for their navies.

Although the per-ship costs rose greatly over the period of production, all 51 ships planned for the U.S. Navy were built.

During the design phase of the Oliver Hazard Perry class, the head of the Royal Corps of Naval Constructors, R.J. Daniels, was invited by an old friend, U.S. Chief of the Bureau of Ships, Adm Robert C Gooding, to advise upon the use of variable-pitch propellers in the class. During this conversation, Daniels warned Gooding against the use of aluminium in the superstructure of the FFG-7 class as he believed it would lead to structural weaknesses. A number of ships subsequently developed structural cracks, including a  fissure in USS Duncan, before the problems were remedied.

The Oliver Hazard Perry-class frigates were designed primarily as anti-aircraft and anti-submarine warfare guided-missile warships intended to provide open-ocean escort of amphibious warfare ships and merchant ship convoys in moderate threat environments in a potential war with the Soviet Union and the Warsaw Pact countries. They could also provide air defense against 1970s- and 1980s-era aircraft and anti-ship missiles. These warships are equipped to escort and protect aircraft carrier battle groups, amphibious landing groups, underway replenishment groups, and merchant ship convoys. They can conduct independent operations to perform tasks such as surveillance of illegal drug smugglers, maritime interception operations, and exercises with other nations.

The addition of the Naval Tactical Data System, LAMPS helicopters, and the Tactical Towed Array System (TACTAS) gave these warships a combat capability far beyond the original expectations. They are well suited for operations in littoral regions and most war-at-sea scenarios.

Notable combat actions

Oliver Hazard Perry-class frigates made worldwide news during the 1980s. Despite being small, these frigates were shown to be very durable. During the Iran–Iraq War, on 17 May 1987,  was attacked by an Iraqi warplane. Struck by two Exocet anti-ship missiles, thirty-seven U.S. Navy sailors died in the deadly prelude to the American Operation Earnest Will, the reflagging and escorting of oil tankers through the Persian Gulf and the Straits of Hormuz.

Less than a year later, on 14 April 1988,  was nearly sunk by an Iranian mine. There were no deaths, but ten sailors were evacuated from the warship for medical treatment. The crew of Samuel B. Roberts battled fire and flooding for two days, ultimately managing to save the ship. The U.S. Navy retaliated four days later with Operation Praying Mantis, a one-day attack on Iranian oil platforms being used as bases for raids on merchant shipping. Those had included bases for the minelaying operations that damaged Samuel B. Roberts. Stark and Roberts were each repaired in American shipyards and returned to full service. Stark was decommissioned in 1999 and scrapped in 2006. Roberts was decommissioned at Mayport on 22 May 2015.

On 18 April 1988,  was accompanying the cruiser  and frigate  when they came under attack from the Iranian gunboat , which fired a U.S.-made Harpoon anti-ship missile at the ships. With Simpson having the only clear shot, the frigate fired an SM-1 standard missile, which struck Joshan. Simpson fired three more SM-1s, and with later naval fire from Wainwright, sank the Iranian vessel.

Durability
On 14 July 2016, the ex- took over 12 hours to sink after being used in a live fire, SINKEX during naval exercise RIMPAC 2016. During the exercise, the ship was directly or indirectly hit with the following ordnance: a Harpoon missile from a South Korean submarine, another Harpoon missile from the Australian frigate , a Hellfire missile from an Australian MH-60R helicopter, another Harpoon missile and a Maverick missile from U.S. maritime patrol aircraft, another Harpoon missile from the cruiser , additional Hellfire missiles from a U.S. Navy MH-60S helicopter, a 900 kg (2,000 lb) Mark 84 bomb from a U.S. Navy F/A-18 Hornet, a GBU-12 Paveway laser-guided 225 kg (500 lb) bomb from a U.S. Air Force B-52 bomber, and a Mark 48 torpedo from an unnamed U.S. Navy submarine.

Modifications

United States
The U.S. Navy and Royal Australian Navy modified their remaining Perrys to reduce their operating costs, replacing Detroit Diesel Company 16V149TI electrical generators with Caterpillar, Inc.- 3512B diesel engines.

Upgrades to the Perry class were problematic due to "little reserved space for growth (39 tons in the original design), and the inflexible, proprietary electronics of the time", such that the "US Navy gave up on the idea of upgrades to face new communications realities and advanced missile threats". The U.S. Navy decommissioned 25 "FFG-7 Short" ships via "bargain basement sales to allies or outright retirement, after an average of only 18 years of service".

From 2004 to 2005, the U.S. Navy removed the frigates' Mk 13 single-arm missile launchers because the primary missile, the Standard SM-1MR, had become outmoded. It would supposedly have been too costly to refit the Standard SM-1MR missiles, which had little ability to bring down sea-skimming missiles. Another reason was to allow more SM-1MRs to go to American allies that operated Perrys, such as Poland, Spain, Australia, Turkey, and Taiwan. As a result, the "zone-defense" anti-aircraft warfare (AAW) capability of the U.S. Navy's Perrys had vanished, and all that remained was a "point-defense" type of anti-air warfare armament, so they relied upon cover from AEGIS destroyers and cruisers.

The removal of the Mk 13 launchers also stripped the frigates of their Harpoon anti-ship missiles. However, their Seahawk helicopters could still carry the much shorter-range Penguin and Hellfire anti-ship missiles. The last nine ships of the class had new remotely operated 25 mm Mk 38 Mod 2 Machine Gun Systems (MGSs) installed on platforms over the old Mk 13 launcher magazine.

Up to 2002, the U.S. Navy updated the remaining active Oliver Hazard Perry-class warships' Phalanx CIWS to the "Block 1B" capability, which allowed the Mk 15 20 mm Phalanx gun to shoot at fast-moving surface craft and helicopters. They were also to have been fitted with the Mk 53 Decoy Launching System "Nulka" in place of the SRBOC (Super Rapid Blooming Offboard Chaff) and flares, which would have better protected the ship against anti-ship missiles. It was planned to outfit the remaining ships with a 21-cell RIM-116 Rolling Airframe Missile launcher at the location of the former Mk 13, but this did not occur.

On 11 May 2009, the first International Frigate Working Group met at Mayport Naval Station to discuss maintenance, obsolescence, and logistics issues regarding Oliver Hazard Perry-class ships of the U.S. and foreign navies.

On 16 June 2009, Vice Admiral Barry McCullough turned down the suggestion of then-U.S. Senator Mel Martinez (R-FL) to keep the Perrys in service, citing their worn-out and maxed-out condition. However, U.S. Representative Ander Crenshaw (R-FL) and former U.S. Representative Gene Taylor (D-MS) took up the cause to retain the vessels.

The Oliver Hazard Perry-class frigates were to have been eventually replaced by Littoral Combat Ships by 2019. However, the worn-out frigates were being retired faster than the LCSs were being built, which may lead to a gap in United States Southern Command mission coverage. According to Navy deactivation plans, all Oliver Hazard Perry-class frigates would be retired by October 2015. Simpson was the last to be retired (on 29 September 2015), leaving the Navy devoid of frigates for the first time since 1943. The ships will either be made available for sale to foreign navies or dismantled. 

Perry-class frigate retirement was accelerated by budget pressures, leading to the remaining 11 ships being replaced by only eight LCS hulls. With the timeline LCS mission packages will come online unknown, there is uncertainty if they will be able to perform the frigates' counter-narcotics and anti-submarine roles when they are gone. The Navy is looking into Military Sealift Command to see if the Joint High Speed Vessel, Mobile Landing Platform, and other auxiliary ships could handle low-end missions that the frigates performed.

The U.S. Coast Guard harvested weapons systems components from decommissioned Navy Perry-class frigates to save money. Harvesting components from four decommissioned frigates resulted in more than $24 million in cost savings, which increases with parts from more decommissioned frigates. Equipment including Mk 75 76 mm/62 caliber gun mounts, gun control panels, barrels, launchers, junction boxes, and other components was returned to service aboard s to extend their service lives into the 2030s.

In June 2017, Chief of Naval Operations Admiral John Richardson revealed the Navy was "taking a hard look" at reactivating 7-8 out of 12 mothballed Perry-class frigates to increase fleet numbers. While the move was under consideration, there would be difficulties in returning them to service given the age of the ships and their equipment, likely requiring a significant modernization effort. Although bringing the frigates out of retirement would have provided a short-term solution to fleet size, their limited combat capability would restrict them to acting as a theater security cooperation, maritime security asset. Their likely role would have been serving as basic surface platforms that stay close to U.S. shores, performing missions such as assisting drug interdiction efforts or patrolling the Arctic so an extensive upgrade to the ships' combat systems would not need to be undertaken. An October 2017 memo recommended against reactivating the frigates, claiming it would cost too much money, taking funding away from other Navy priorities for ships with little effectiveness.

Australia

Australia spent A$1.46bn to upgrade the Royal Australian Navy's (RAN)  guided-missile frigates, including equipping them to fire the SM-2 version of the Standard missile, adding an eight-cell Mark 41 Vertical Launching System (VLS) for Evolved SeaSparrow Missiles (ESSMs), and installing better air-search radars and long-range sonar. The RAN had opted to retain their Adelaide frigates rather than purchase the U.S. Navy's  destroyers; the Kidds were more capable but more expensive and manpower intensive. However, the upgrade project ran over budget and fell behind schedule.

The first of the upgraded frigates, returned to the RAN fleet in 2005. Four frigates were eventually upgraded at the Garden Island shipyard in Sydney, Australia, with the modernizations lasting between 18 months and two years. HMAS Darwin was also decommissioned at Garden Island in 2018.

The Adelaide-class frigates were replaced by three Hobart-class air warfare destroyers equipped with the AEGIS combat system. HMAS Melbourne and Newcastle were transferred in May 2020 to the Chilean Navy and serve as Captain Prat and Almirante Latorre.

Turkey
The Turkish Navy started the modernization of its s with the GENESIS (Gemi Entegre Savaş İdare Sistemi) combat management system in 2007. The first GENESIS upgraded ship was delivered in 2007, and the last delivery was scheduled for 2011. The "short-hull" Oliver Hazard Perry-class frigates that are currently part of the Turkish Navy were modified with the ASIST landing platform system at the Gölcük Naval Shipyard so that they can accommodate the S-70B Seahawk helicopters. Turkey is planning to add one eight-cell Mk 41 VLS for the ESSM, to be installed forward of the present Mk 13 missile launchers, similar to the case in the modernization program of the Australian Adelaide-class frigates. 

TCG Gediz was the first ship in the class to receive the Mk 41 VLS installation.
There are plans for new components to be installed that are being developed for the Milgem-class warships (Ada-class corvettes and F-100-class frigates) of the Turkish Navy. These include modern Three-dimensional and X-band radars developed by ASELSAN and Turkish-made hull-mounted sonars. One of the G-class frigates will also be used as a test-bed for Turkey's 6,000+ ton  AAW frigates that are currently being designed by the Turkish Naval Institute.

Operators

:  was purchased from the American government in 1996 and re-christened .
Both frigates were delivered to the Chilean Navy in May 2020 and named Capitan Prat and Almirante Latorre.
: Four Oliver Hazard Perry-class frigates were transferred from the U.S. Navy between 1996 and 1999.
: The former  transferred to the Pakistani Navy as PNS Alamgir (F260) in August 2010.
: Two frigates were transferred from the U.S. Navy in 2000 and 2002.
: Spanish-built: six frigates.
: Taiwanese-built. Originally, eight ships were equipped with eight Hsiung Feng II anti-ship missiles. Now, all but PFG-1103 are carrying four HF-2 and four HF-3 supersonic AShM. The PFG-1103 Cheng Ho will change the anti-ship mix upon their major overhaul. Seven out of eight ships added Bofors 40 mm/L70 guns for both surface and anti-air use. On 5 November 2012, Minister of Defense Kao announced the U.S. government would sell Taiwan two additional Perry-class frigates that are about to be retired from the U.S. Navy for a cost of US$240 million to be retrofitted and delivered in 2015. The ex-USS Gary and the ex-USS Taylor were to be reactivated and transferred to Taiwan. In July 2016, the U.S. Naval Sea Systems Command awarded a $74 million contract to Virginia-based VSE Corporation to do the work. According to the contract, VSE had 16 months to complete the work. The U.S. State Department officially approved the sale of both ships for $190 million in March 2016. The ships were commissioned into ROCN service on 8 November 2018.
: Eight former U.S. Navy Oliver Hazard Perry-class frigates were transferred to the Turkish Navy between 1998 and 2003. All have undergone extensive advanced modernization programs, and they are now known as the G-class frigates. The Turkish Navy modernized G-class frigates have an additional Mk 41 VLS capable of launching ESSMs for closer-in defense and longer-range SM-1 missiles, advanced digital fire control systems, and new Turkish-made sonars.

Potential operators
This transfer was not carried out; Rentz was sunk as a target during Exercise Valiant Shield 2016, and Vandegrift was sunk as a target during Exercise Valiant Shield 2022.
: Two former U.S. Navy Oliver Hazard Perry-class ships were offered to the Ukrainian Navy in 2018 to increase its operational capacity in the Azov and Black seas after it was significantly reduced following the annexation of Crimea by Russia (a large part of Ukrainian navy vessels stationed there were seized).

Former operators
: The Royal Australian Navy purchased six frigates. Four of them were built in the United States, while the other two were built in Australia. Four of the ships were upgraded with the addition of an eight-cell Mk 41 VLS with 32 ESSMs, and the Standard Missile SM-2, plus upgraded radars and sonars, while the other two ships were decommissioned at that time. They have been replaced by the  air-warfare destroyers, with the last Adelaide-class frigate  retiring on 26 October 2019.
: The U.S. Navy commissioned 51 FFG-7 class frigates between 1977 and 1989. The last of these, Simpson, was decommissioned on 29 September 2015.

List of vessels

Related legislation

Considered for reactivation
On 13 June 2017, the Chief of Naval Operations, Admiral John M. Richardson announced that U.S. Navy officials were looking into the possibility of recommissioning several Oliver Hazard Perry-class frigates from its inactive fleet to help build up and support President Donald Trump's proposed 355-ship navy plan. On 11 December 2017, the Navy decided against reactivating the class, citing that reactivating the ships would prove too costly. 

As of 3 March 2021, the remaining Oliver Hazard Perry-class frigates, kept at the Naval Inactive Ship Maintenance Facility in
Philadelphia, Pennsylvania, are:

See also

 List of naval ship classes in service

References

Further reading

External links

Oliver Hazard Perry-class frigates at Destroyer History Foundation
Oliver Hazard Perry class frigates: United States Navy Wikipedia book created 20 October 2009 at Internet Archive
Oliver Hazard Perry class frigates 2015: United States Navy Wikipedia book created 22 January 2015 at Internet Archive
Official U.S. Navy Fact File: Frigates 
FFG-7 OLIVER HAZARD PERRY-class: by the Federation of American Scientists
MaritimeQuest Perry Class Overview
Launch of FFG 58

 

 
Naval ships of the United States
Frigate classes